Harold Barnett McSween (July 19, 1926 – January 12, 2002) was a Louisiana businessman and Democratic politician who served in the now defunct 8th congressional district for two terms between 1958 and 1962.

Early life and career 
McSween was born in Alexandria, the seat of Rapides Parish and the largest city in Central Louisiana. He graduated from Bolton High School in Alexandria and attended Louisiana State University in Baton Rouge, where he became an admirer and friend of the historian T. Harry Williams though he majored in English, rather than history. McSween was president of the Rapides Savings and Loan Association in downtown Alexandria. McSween and his wife, the former Sally Foster, had four children, John, Robert, Elizabeth, and Sally.

Congress 
McSween was first elected in 1958 to succeed the late George S. Long, older brother of Huey Pierce Long, Jr., and Earl Kemp Long. Though he had led in the primary, which included a third candidate, former State Representative Ben F. Holt of Rapides Parish, McSween lost the 1960 Democratic congressional runoff primary to former Governor Earl Long. Long died a few days later, and the Democratic State Central Committee, of which Holt was a member, certified McSween the nominee for the November 8 election. In that Republicans failed to offer a candidate, McSween was in the enviable but unlikely position of being unopposed for reelection even after having been denied renomination. Oddly, McSween in effect lost his primary but won his general election without opposition.

On January 31, 1961, McSween joined a slim 217–212 majority to increase the size of the House Rules Committee to permit then Speaker Sam Rayburn of Texas to add newer, more liberal members to the panel, which controls the flow of legislation in the chamber. This vote, also cast by McSween's colleague from Shreveport, Overton Brooks, angered conservatives in both parties. The enlargement of the committee led to passage of the Civil Rights Act of 1964, which struck down segregation in most situations in the United States.

In 1962, Gillis William Long unseated McSween in the Democratic primary. Long's views and voting record were virtually identical to those of McSween.

McSween later ran into legal problems in connection with his savings and loan.

Death and legacy 
In 2001, McSween was inducted into the Louisiana Political Museum and Hall of Fame in Winnfield.

McSween died in Alexandria. He is interred at Greenwood Memorial Park in Pineville.

References

External links
 Bio at Congress.gov
Political Graveyard

1926 births
2002 deaths
American bankers
Bolton High School (Louisiana) alumni
Louisiana State University alumni
Politicians from Alexandria, Louisiana
Democratic Party members of the United States House of Representatives from Louisiana
20th-century American politicians